Minuscule 165 (in the Gregory-Aland numbering), ε 1320 (Soden), is a Greek-Latin minuscule manuscript of the New Testament, on parchment. It is dated by its colophon to the year 1292. It has complex contents. It has marginalia.

Description 

The codex contains a complete text of the four Gospels on 214 thick parchment leaves (size ). The text is written in two columns per page, in 33 lines per page.

There is also another division according to the smaller Ammonian Sections (in Mark 236 sections, the last in 16:12), with references to the Eusebian Canons (written below Ammonian Section numbers).

Text 

The Greek text of the codex is a representative of the Byzantine text-type. Hermann von Soden classified it to the textual family Kx. Aland did not place it in any Category.

According to the Claremont Profile Method it represents textual family Kx in Luke 10. In Luke 1 and Luke 20 it has mixture of the Byzantine text-families. It creates textual pair with Minuscule 176, related to the group 22.

The Pericope Adulterae (John 7:53-8:11) is marked by an obelus as doubtful.

History 

The manuscript was probably written in Calabria. The subscription states that it was written by Romanus for one Archbishop Paul, and given to the Library by Eugenia, daughter of John Pontanus († 1503).

It was examined by Birch (about 1782), Scholz (1794-1852), Victor Gardthausen. C. R. Gregory saw it in 1886.

It is currently housed at the Vatican Library (Barb. gr. 541), at Rome.

See also 

 List of New Testament minuscules
 Biblical manuscript
 Textual criticism

References

Further reading 

 V. Gardthausen, in: Sitzungsbericht der Philosophisch-Historischen Classe der Sächsischen Gesellschaft der Wissenschaften 32 (Leipzig, 1880), pp. 73–78.

External links 

 Minuscule 165

Greek New Testament minuscules
Vulgate manuscripts
13th-century biblical manuscripts
Manuscripts of the Vatican Library